Nebria eugeniae is a species of ground beetle in the Nebriinae subfamily that is endemic to Bulgaria.

References

External links
Nebria eugeniae at Fauna Europaea

eugeniae
Beetles of Europe
Endemic fauna of Bulgaria
Beetles described in 1903